The 1937 U.S. Open was the 41st U.S. Open, held June 10–12 at the South Course of Oakland Hills Country Club in Birmingham, Michigan, a suburb northwest of Detroit. Ralph Guldahl won the first of his two consecutive U.S. Opens, two strokes ahead of runner-up Sam Snead, making his U.S. Open debut.

Snead opened with a 69 to share the lead with Denny Shute. Through 54 holes, Snead and Guldahl trailed Ed Dudley by a stroke. During the final round on Saturday afternoon, Dudley shot a 76 and fell out of contention, while Snead birdied the last to finish with a 71 and a 283 total. After bogeys at 10 and 11, he rallied with birdies on the next two holes. He then went even on his last five holes to finish with a 69 and a 281 total, two better than Snead and a stroke better than the previous tournament record, set the previous year by Tony Manero.

Two years earlier, Guldahl had become so frustrated with the game that he quit to become a carpenter. After deciding to return to the game, he went through a period of dominance throughout the late-1930s. He won the Western Open, then considered on-par with the major championships, three years in a row; was runner-up in the Masters Tournament in 1937 and 1938 before winning in 1939; and successfully defended this U.S. Open title in 1938. For Snead, age 25, this tournament was just the beginning of a hard-luck career in the U.S. Open; he finished runner-up four times at the only major he never won.

Guldahl won the title with 19 clubs in his bag. The USGA rule (4-4) regarding a maximum of 14 clubs went into effect the following January.

The South Course previously hosted the U.S. Open in 1924, also at par 72, and it returned at par 70 in 1951, 1961, 1985, and 1996. It also later hosted the PGA Championship in 1972, 1979, and 2008. The second par-5 holes on each nine (#8, #18) were played at par-4.

Course layout

South Course

Source:

Length of the course for previous major:
 , par 72 - 1924 U.S. Open

Past champions in the field

Made the cut 

Source:

Missed the cut 

Source:

Round summaries

First round
Thursday, June 10, 1937

Source:

Second round
Friday, June 11, 1937

Source:

Third round
Saturday, June 12, 1937 (morning)

Source:

Final round
Saturday, June 12, 1937 (afternoon)

Source:
(a) = amateur

Scorecard

Cumulative tournament scores, relative to par

Source:

References

External links
USGA Championship Database
USOpen.com - 1937

U.S. Open (golf)
Golf in Michigan
Bloomfield Hills, Michigan
U.S. Open
U.S. Open
U.S. Open
U.S. Open (golf)